Arsen Balabekyan (born 24 November 1986), is an Armenian football striker. He currently plays for the Armenian Premier League club Alashkert FC.

He began his career at FC Kotayk of Abovyan, but soon found himself at FC Banants.

Achievements
Armenian Cup with Banants Yerevan: 2007

External links
Profile at ffa.am

1986 births
Living people
Armenian footballers
Armenia international footballers
Armenia under-21 international footballers
FC Urartu players
Ulisses FC players
Footballers from Yerevan
Armenian Premier League players
FC Alashkert players
Association football forwards